The Church of Saint Cajetan, known as the church of San Millán y San Cayetano is a Baroque church in Madrid, Spain.

History 
The present church was built adjacent to the now absent Convent of Nuestra Señora del Favor (Our Lady of the Graces). It was built at the site of an oratory dedicated to St. Mark and Our Lady of the Graces, and founded in 1612 by Diego de Vera y Ordóñez de Villaquián. Thirty two years later, the father Plácido Mirto establishes a Convent of the Theatine Order. The church is dedicated to the founder of the order, Saint Cajetan of Thiene. In 1822, the remaining monks were moved to a convent in Zaragoza, and the convent, which had suffered depredations during the Napoleonic occupation of the peninsula, was ceded temporarily to the Franciscans of San Gil. In 1836, after the Desamortización de Mendizábal, the convent building becomes private apartments. 

In 1869, the church is joined to the parish of the demolished Saint Millán Abad (hence the current dedication of the church). On July 19, 1936, arson gutted all but the facade. In 1960, reconstruction began on the church. In 1980 San Cayetano was declared  a Bien de Interés Cultural by the Spanish government.

Description 

Construction of the church began in 1669 by the architect Marcos López. Work was continued by others, including likely José de Churriguera and Pedro de Ribera, and not completed till 1761 by Francisco de Moradillo.

Moradillo's facade was built of granite, and features three arches. Over the arches are statues of San Cajetan, Our Lady of Grace, and San Andrés Avelino, by Pedro Alonso de los Ríos.

See also 
Catholic Church in Spain
List of oldest church buildings

References

External links 

 La iglesia de San Cayetano, del siglo XVIII, en peligro de ruina inminente, El País, 11 de mayo de 1980
 Iglesia de San Cayetano. Madrid Histórico.
 Intervención de Pedro de Ribera en la Iglesia de San Cayetano. Boletín de la Real Academia de Bellas Artes de San Fernando. Segundo semestre de 1993. Número 77 '
Translated from Spanish Wikipedia entry.

Roman Catholic churches completed in 1761
18th-century Roman Catholic church buildings in Spain
Cayetano
Bien de Interés Cultural landmarks in Madrid
Buildings and structures in Embajadores neighborhood, Madrid